Israeli Cassini Soldner (ICS), commonly known as the Old Israeli Grid (OIG;  Reshet Yisra'el Ha-Yeshana) is the old geographic coordinate system for Israel. The name is derived from the Cassini Soldner projection it uses and the fact that it is optimized for Israel. ICS has been mostly replaced by the new coordinate system Israeli Transverse Mercator (ITM), also known as the New Israeli Grid (NIG), but still referenced by older books and navigation software.

History
The Cassini Soldner projection was used by the British Mandate of Palestine, when it was called the Palestine grid. The Palestine grid reached as south as Beer-Sheba. To avoid the existence of negative coordinates in the southern Negev, the False Northing of ICS was increased by 1000000. As a result, coordinates in the south of Israel are higher than 800000.

Examples

An ICS coordinate is generally given as a pair of two numbers (excluding any digits behind a decimal point which may be used in very precise surveying). The first number is always the Easting and the second is the Northing. The easting and northing are in metres from the false origin. The easting is always a 6 digit number while the northing has 6 or 7 digits.

The ICS coordinate for the Western Wall at Jerusalem is:

E 172249 m
N 1131586 m

The first figure is the easting and means that the location is 172,249 meters east from the false origin (along the X axis). The second figure is the northing and puts the location 1,131,586 meters north of the false origin (along the Y axis). Also notice how the easting in this example is indicated with an “E” and likewise an “N” for the northing. The fact that the coordinate is in meters is indicated by the lowercase m.

The table below shows the same coordinate in 3 different grids:

Grid parameters
The ICS coordinate system is defined by the following parameters:

 Projection: Cassini Soldner
 Reference ellipsoid: Clarke 80 Modified
 a(m): 6378300.789
 1/f:  293.466
 Main datum point values:
 Latitude of origin (D-M-S): 31 44  2.748999999990644
 Longitude of origin (D-M-S): 35 12 43.490000000012970
 Main point grid values:
 False Easting (m): 170251.5549999999
 False Northing(m): 1126867.909
 Grid scale factor: 1

References

Sources 
 Official ICS Grid Definition
 MAPI (Mapping Center of Israel) official website (Hebrew).
 Geography educational website  of Haifa's university.

External links
 MAPI (Mapping Center of Israel) official website (Hebrew).
 Geography educational website  of Haifa's university.

Geographic coordinate systems
Geography of Israel
Land surveying systems
Geodesy